Grooved pavement may refer to:

 Pavement milling
 Diamond grinding of pavement